The 2012 Asian Men's Youth Handball Championship (5th tournament) took place in Manama from September 6–15. It acts as the Asian qualifying tournament for the 2013 Men's Youth World Handball Championship.

Draw

Preliminary round

Group A

Group B

Placement 9th–12th

Semifinals

11th/12th

9th/10th

Placement 5th–8th

Semifinals

7th/8th

5th/6th

Final round

Semifinals

Bronze medal match

Gold medal match

Final standing

References

www.handball.jp
www.goalzz.com
Results

International handball competitions hosted by the United Arab Emirates
Asian Mens Youth Handball Championship, 2012
Asia
Asian Handball Championships